Eunice is a feminine given name, from the Greek Εὐνίκη, Euníkē, from "eu", good, and "níkē", victory. Eunice is also a relatively rare last name, found in Nigeria and the Southeastern United States, chiefly Louisiana and Georgia.

People

Given name
Eunice (Bible), mother of Timothy
Eunice (Bosporan queen), wife of Bosporan Roman Client King Tiberius Julius Cotys I
Eunice, born Heo Soo-yeon, member of Kpop girl group DIA
Eunice Alberts (1927–2012), American opera singer
Eunice Eloisae Gibbs Allyn (1847–1916), American correspondent, author, poet 
Eunice Crowther (1916–1986), British singer, dancer, and choreographer	
Eunice Hale Waite Cobb (1803–1880), American writer, public speaker, activist
Eunice Caldwell Cowles (1811–1903), American educator
Eunice Eichler (1932–2017), New Zealand Salvation Army officer, nurse, midwife and open adoption advocate
Eunice Eisden (born 1961), Curaçaoan politician
Eunice Newton Foote (1819–1888), American atmospheric scientist and civil rights advocate
Eunice Frost (1914–1998), British publisher
Eunice Gayson (1928–2018), English actress
Eunice Huthart (born 1966), British stuntwoman
Eunice Rivers Laurie (1899–1986), African American nurse
Eunice Murray (1878–1960), Scottish suffrage campaigner, author, folklorist. First Scottish woman to stand in the first election open to women in 1918.
Eunice Norton (1908–2005), American pianist
Eunice Olawale (died 2016), Nigerian Christian female preacher and murder victim
Eunice Olsen (born 1977), winner of the Miss Singapore Universe contest in 2000 and Singapore version of Vanna White
Eunice Olumide (born 1987), Scottish model of Nigerian descent
Eunice Parsons (born 1916), American modernist collage artist and art teacher.
Eunice Kennedy Shriver (1921–2009), sister of JFK, founder of the Special Olympics
Eunice Spry (born 1944), British criminal
Eunice Sum (born 1988), Kenyan middle-distance runner
Eunice Kathleen Waymon, birth name of Nina Simone (1933–2003), American singer, pianist and arranger.
Eunice Muñoz (born 1928), Portuguese actress

Greek mythological figures
Eunice (mythology), one of the Nereids
Eunice, one of the would-be sacrificial victims of Minotaur
Eunice, one of the spring nymphs responsible for kidnapping Hylas

Fictional characters
DC Eunice Noon, Darego's police partner on the British dark-comedy TV drama The End of the F***ing World
Eunice, a character in the 1895 novel Quo Vadis by Polish author Henryk Sienkiewicz
Eunice Bates, a character from the romantic comedy sports film She's the Man
Eunice Burns, a character in the 1972 romantic comedy film What's Up, Doc?
Eunice Harper Higgins, fictional character from The Carol Burnett Show and Mama's Family
Eunice Dunstan, a character in the Irish soap opera Fair City
Sister Mary Eunice McKee, a character in American Horror Story: Asylum
Eunice Tate, a character on the TV sitcom Soap
Eunice Tolling, a character in the Enid Blyton book The Mystery of the Missing Man

Places

Inhabited places
Eunice, Alberta, Westlock County, Alberta, Canada
Eunice, Arkansas, a ghost town in Chicot County, Arkansas, U.S.
Eunice, Kentucky, U.S.
Eunice, Louisiana, U.S.
Eunice, Missouri, U.S.
Eunice, New Mexico, U.S.
Eunice, West Virginia, U.S.

Lakes
Eunice Lake (Pierce County, Washington), U.S.
Eunice Lake (Nova Scotia), lake in Nova Scotia, Canada

Zoology
Eunice (annelid), a genus in the worm family Eunicidae
Eunice, a genus of brush-footed butterflies invalidly established by Geyer in 1832; now Eunica

Other uses
Eunice (film), a 1982 television film based on the Carol Burnett character Eunice Harper Higgins
Eunice (software), a Unix emulation package for the VAX/VMS operating system
Eunice High School, St. Landry Parish, Louisiana
Eunice (storm), a 2022 cyclone over northwestern Europe

See also 

EUNIS (disambiguation)
Eunuch (disambiguation)
Jonah (or Yunis), biblical figure
Yunus (surah), in the Quran
UNECE, European UN body
UNICE (disambiguation)
Unix (disambiguation)

Feminine given names